Blepharoa mamestrina is a moth of the family Noctuidae. It is found in Chile and Peru.

Adults are on wing from September to April.

References

Noctuinae
Moths of South America
Taxa named by Arthur Gardiner Butler
Moths described in 1882